Solo Avital is an Israeli-born American inventor and product designer, award-winning filmmaker, digital artist, musician, and entrepreneur.

CEO at SoloQi - 2019 to present:
Based in Los Angeles, California.

Avital designed a universal wireless charging ecosystem to effortlessly charge and use the phones hands-free supporting hundreds of phone models. 
SoloQi has patented a magnetic pad utilizing the powerful pull force of the thinnest neodymium magnets with customizable options such as RFID and NFC chip for contactless access, as well as hotel room keys, contact exchange, and many other NFC applications. The company's products are customizable for clients and can be embedded with logos and other prints.

Career

Germany
Avital started his professional career as a digital artist at the German Babelsberg Film Studios as a senior 3D artist and a CGI Compositor.

Israel
In 2001 Avital directed his documentary film Keep on Dancing about youth culture in Israel.

In 2003 Avital released his second documentary Art Liberates produced for the Israeli documentary channel 8 about artists in Germany.  

Avital's 2006 award-winning documentary film ...More Than 1000 Words portrays two years in the life of Israel's war photographer Ziv Koren,
The film was banned by the Iranian regime and stirred controversy Variety Magazin  

Comedy
In 2008 Avital filmed and directed the German comedy titled Laughing in Tears Starring: Iris Berben Featuring: Sarah Silverman, Lewis Black, Ephraim Kishon, Harald Schmidt, Mario Barth, Gerhard Polt, Hana Laszlo among other comedians.
Produced by Oliver Berben "MOOVIE the art of entertainment"

From 2008 to 2010 Avital had written the script for an animated feature film titled THE POINT OF NO RETURN.
An espionage thriller based on the bestseller book by Dr. Ronen Bergman "The Secret War with Iran. (Simon & Schuster)

Sound track
In 2011 Solo was responsible for all the visual design and also composed the complete 240 minutes soundtrack for the German mini series CRIME. Stories taken from Ferdinand von Schirach bestseller VERBRECHEN.
The soundtrack was released on iTunes Germany under the title VERBRECHEN SOUNDTRACK by Solo Avital.

Berlin
In 2012 Avital returned to Berlin for the second time and started to focus on developing hardware solutions for mobile phones while continuing his work in the German film industry as a visual effects artist for cinema and music composer.

Director's filmography

2008 - Laughing in Tears 90:MIN ZDF
2006 - ...More Than 1000 Words, 79:MIN
2004 - Art Liberates, 54:MIN
2003 - Keep On Dancing, 24:MIN

Highlights

2012 - Directing RED Music video for the New York City based music group Nanuchka.

2012 - Creating the artwork Signation for mini-series  by ZDF.

2011 - Verbrechen - Soundtrack and visual effects for Moovie the art of entertainment.

2009 - Directed the 4K digital cinema logo animation for UFA Cinema, Germany.

2008 - Directed the music video Drom America for Dani Reichental, Israel.

2007 - VFX supervision Rosa Roth, Germany.

2006 - VFX supervision Africa Mon Amour, Germany.

2005 - VFX supervision Die Patriarchin, Germany.

1998 - Digital compositor The Legend of 1900 (Giuseppe Tornatore), UK.

1997 - Digital compositor Lost In Space (Stephen Hopkins), UK.

Awards

Startup Award for ChargeShare:
2013 ChargeShare wins the Berlin Hardware Accelerator "HERE'S MY WALLET AWARD" by KPMG

Awards for his film ...More Than 1000 Words'':

2007 Warsaw Phoenix Award and Best Audience Choice, Warsaw Film Festival - Poland
2006 Best Feature Documentary, Winnipeg International Film Festival - Canada
2006 Margrit & Robert Mondavi Film Prize for Peace and Understanding, Napa Sonoma Wine Country Film Festival - USA
2006 Best Feature Film, BRIDGE International Film Festival - Canada
2006 Best Professional Documentary, REEL to REAL Film Festival - USA
2006 Best Israeli Film and Best Film of the Festival''', Youngstown's Jewish Film Festival - USA

References

1968 births
Living people
Israeli Jews
Israeli composers
Israeli female screenwriters